Saint Wendel or Saint Wendelin may refer to:
 Wendelin of Trier (–), German hermit and abbot
 Sankt Wendel, a municipality in Saarland, Germany
Saint Wendel, a constituency of the German Parliament
 Saint Wendel, Indiana
 St. Wendel Township, Stearns County, Minnesota, United States
 St. Wendelin chapel, Freiburg im Breisgau, Germany
 St. Wendelin High School, Fostoria, Ohio, United States

See also
 São Vendelino, a municipality in the state Rio Grande do Sul, Brazil settled by immigrants from Sankt Wendel, Germany